Izetta Sombo Wesley is the head of the Liberia Football Association, which governs football in Liberia, including the national football team. Wesley was the first woman in Africa to head a football association when she took control in February 2004. Wesley was re-elected in March 2006 for a 4-year period.

References

Sources
 "Can women help improve football in Africa?" 4 March, 2004, BBC News
 "Two Solid Punches Retain Izetta Until 2010" 20 March 2006, The Liberian Observer 

Year of birth missing (living people)
Living people
Liberian sportswomen
Football in Liberia